The USC Leonard Davis School of Gerontology is one of the seventeen academic divisions of the University of Southern California in Los Angeles, focusing in undergraduate and graduate programs in gerontology,

History 
Founded in 1975, the Leonard Davis School was the United States of America's first professional School of Gerontology. Its research and services component is the USC Ethel Percy Andrus Gerontology Center. Research in molecular biology, neuroscience, demography, psychology, sociology and public policy is conducted at the Andrus Gerontology Center, founded in 1964.

The school offered the world's first Ph.D. in Gerontology, the first joint master's degree in Gerontology and Business Administration, and the first undergraduate Health Science Track in Gerontology. The Leonard Davis School also offered the first internet-based educational program to be approved by the Western Association of Schools and Colleges.

Academics 
The school offers two undergraduate degrees. The Bachelor of Science in Human Development and Aging has a health science track designed for students who wish to pursue medicine or other health related fields, and a social science track that focuses on human development via the behavioral sciences, designed for students pursuing law, policy, psychology, sociology, and health administration. The Bachelor of Science in Lifespan Health is for students pursuing medicine and health related fields, and its material focuses on disease prevention, detection, and treatment.

Its graduate programs include five master's degrees and two doctorates. All masters programs have the option to be completed online. The Master of Science in Gerontology is targeted towards students aiming for professional leadership positions, while the Master of Arts in Gerontology is formal training in gerontology for current professionals. The Master of Long Term Care Administration focuses on long-term care. The Master of Aging Services Management provides leadership training on management related specifically to aging services businesses such as residential, assisted living, retirement, home, or hospice care, while also including information on demography, health and culture. The Master of Science in Nutrition, Healthspan and Longevity is about nutrition and dietetics, as applicable to health and aging care facilities, food service programs, personal wellness, private practice, scientific research on health and longevity, or in policy and advocacy. Graduates may take the Commission of Dietetics Registration's national registration examination once graduated. Upon passing, graduates may receive the Registered Dietitian Nutritionist (RDN) credential.

Students working towards a Doctorate in Gerontology study the field of aging, especially research toward improving the quality of life throughout the entire lifespan.

Students working towards a Doctorate in Biology of Aging study molecular, cellular, and regenerative medicine as well as the integrative biology of aging. The program, the first of its kind in the United States, is coordinated by both the school and the Buck Institute for Research on Aging; students can choose a mentor and Ph.D. faculty committee from either. Students take core courses on the molecular and cellular biology of aging and age-related diseases, and then select a track among neuroscience, molecular, and cellular biology, stem cell and regenerative sciences, and biomedical sciences.

Ethel Percy Andrus Gerontology Center
The Ethel Percy Andrus Gerontology Center is the research and services component of the USC Leonard Davis School.  Established in 1964, it is the nation's first multidisciplinary research center devoted to aging. Its primary goal is to provide scientific information about the process of human development as it applies to individuals, families, organizations, and societies. Students at all levels are encouraged to take part in a variety of programs involving service, research, and other scholarly pursuits at the USC Andrus Center.

Following are examples of research programs and services at the Ethel Percy Andrus Gerontology Center:

The USC Longevity Institute unites multidisciplinary aging research approaches in order to maximize the healthy life span.

The USC Memory and Aging Center (MAC) focuses on reducing the cognitive and behavioral impact of Alzheimer's disease and cerebrovascular dementia among ethnically diverse populations.

The USC/UCLA Center on Biodemography & Population Health (CBPH) a multi-site center specializing in the demography of aging sponsored by the National Institute on Aging.

The Fall Prevention Center of Excellence (FPCE) seeks to better understand and identify causes of falls among older persons and develop effective interventions at individual, program, and system-wide levels.

The Los Angeles Caregiver Resource Center (LACRC) is part of a statewide system of regional resource centers serving families and caregivers of adults with brain impairment.

The Roybal Institute for Applied Gerontology is a research and education center devoted to improving the health and health care of older persons and their families, with particular emphasis on low-income and multiethnic communities.

Notable faculty and alumni 

 Jennifer Ailshire
 Bérénice Benayoun
 Pinchas Cohen
 Eileen Crimmins
 Sean Curran
 Kelvin Davies
 Susan Enguidanos
 Caleb Finch
 Jessica Ho
 Andrei Irimia
 Changhan "David" Lee
 Valter Longo
 Mara Mather
 Christian Pike
 Jon Pynoos
 Edward L. Schneider
 Reginald Tucker-Seeley
 John Walsh
 Kathleen Wilber
 Elizabeth Zelinski.

References

External links

Gerontology organizations
Gerontology
Educational institutions established in 1975
University subdivisions in California